Mandela is a  (municipality) in the Metropolitan City of Rome in the Italian region of Lazio, located about  northeast of Rome.

Mandela borders the following municipalities: Anticoli Corrado, Cineto Romano, Licenza, Percile, Roccagiovine, Roviano, Saracinesco, Vicovaro.

References

Cities and towns in Lazio